The National Edition of the Works of Fryderyk Chopin, commonly referred to as the Chopin National Edition or the Polish National Edition, is an urtext edition of the complete works by Frédéric Chopin, aiming to present his output in its authentic form.

Started by Jan Ekier in 1959, the entirety of Chopin's known works were published in 37 volumes from 1967 to 2010, accompanied by source and performance commentaries. The Chopin National Edition is considered the authoritative edition of Chopin's works, and is recommended to contestants of the International Chopin Piano Competition.

History 

In 1959, Jan Ekier started the project of a new critical edition of Chopin's works, as he came to the conclusion that the prevailing Paderewski edition presented a "false image of Chopin's music in many aspects". The first volume of Ballades was published in 1967 by PWM Edition, featuring a minimalist design with white covers. A total of nine volumes were published up to 1991, with a publication rhythm that correlated to each edition of the quinquennial International Chopin Piano Competition.

After the Revolutions of 1989, the edition was re-evaluated from a market perspective. While the first editions were typeset manually and accompanied by Polish commentary only, the new editions were typeset using SCORE, with bilingual (Polish and English) annotations.

In 1998, Ekier established the Foundation for the National Edition of the Works of Fryderyk Chopin, for fundraising, research, publication and promotion of the National Edition. In 2004, he received a special award from the Minister of Culture of Poland, "in recognition of his outstanding contribution to the preservation and popularization of the legacy of Fryderyk Chopin, in particular for the monumental National Edition of his works, restoring to European culture the art of the great Polish composer in a form closest to its historical original."

The edition was completed in 2010, in time for the bicentenary of Chopin's birth.

Volumes 
As an urtext, the Chopin National Edition aims to produce a musical text that adheres to the original notation and the composer's intentions. All extant sources were analyzed and verified for authenticity, mainly autographs, first editions with Chopin's corrections and pupils' copies with Chopin's annotations. Necessary editorial decisions are documented in each volume's source commentary. Additionally, a separate performance commentary documents cases where Chopin's notation may be misunderstood by contemporary pianists, such as realizations of ornaments and pedaling.

The Chopin National Edition consists of 36 volumes in two series, for works published during Chopin's lifetime (Series A), and for works published posthumously (Series B). A 37th volume (titled Supplement) consists of compositions partly by Chopin, for instance his contribution to Hexameron.

Catalogue (WN) 
The edition provides a new numbering scheme ("WN") for works published after Chopin's death, similar to existing catalogues by Maurice J. E. Brown (B) and Krystyna Kobylańska (KK). Some works have opus numbers assigned after Chopin's death by Julian Fontana, who grouped a number of unpublished piano pieces into eight opus numbers (Op. 66–73).

Reception 
Reception of the National Edition has been positive. Paul Badura-Skoda called it "the best available Chopin edition made with extreme care and precision". Jim Samson wrote that "by far the best of the modern editions is Jan Ekier's Polish National. Ekier does work with well thought-through editorial principles and his text comes closer than any other to a faithful reproduction of a single ('best') source." According to Frans Brüggen, the edition "seems to be very trustworthy. Having compared all the different sources available, Professor Ekier was able to make good editorial decisions."

References

Sources

External links 
 
 Alphabetical index of works
 Numbering and chronology of works

 
Chopin